Colegio Federado de Ingenieros y Arquitectos de Costa Rica is an engineering and architectural institution in Costa Rica.

Institutions of Costa Rica